Siedle is a surname. Notable people with the surname include:

Caroline Siedle (1867–1907), American costume designer
Edward Siedle (1858–1925), American operatic technical director
Jack Siedle (1903–1982), South African cricketer
John Siedle (1932–2008), South African cricketer